The Mer language is a Papuan language of Western New Guinea.

There are several other languages or dialects called Mer:

 Mer, a dialect of the Bench language of Ethiopia
 Meriam language, a Papuan language of Torres Strait

See also
 mer, the ISO 639-3 code for the Meru language